Rich Rocka is the second studio album from San Francisco rapper Ya Boy. It was released on November 5, 2013. Guests include Trae Tha Truth, Clyde Carson, Sam Hook, Kool Money, Short Dawg and others.

Track listing

References

External links
Amazon.co.uk - Rich Rocka (Album)
Allmusic Credits
iTunes.apple.com

2013 albums
Ya Boy albums